Maurício Milani Rua (born 25 November 1981), also known as Shogun, is a Brazilian retired mixed martial artist and former model. He competed in the Light Heavyweight division of the Ultimate Fighting Championship (UFC). He is a former UFC Light Heavyweight Champion. A professional competitor since 2002, Rua is also the 2005 PRIDE Middleweight Grand Prix Champion.

Background
Rua was born on 25 November 1981 and raised in Curitiba, Brazil and is of Italian, and Portuguese descent. Rua's father is a businessman and his mother is a former track athlete and, as of 2005, a marathon runner. He has an older brother, Murilo (nicknamed Ninja, born 1980), and a younger brother, Marcos (nicknamed Shaolin). Both are mixed martial artists training at Universidade da luta, though Marcos does not compete at a professional level. The Rua brothers occasionally take 10-kilometre runs with their mother. Rua began training in Muay Thai at the age of 15 and Brazilian Jiu-Jitsu at the age of 17. Rua followed his older brother in training at the Chute Boxe Academy, and was successful in BJJ championships at the blue and purple belt levels. In addition to Muay Thai and Brazilian Jiu-Jitsu, by 2007 he was also training wrestling and boxing.

Mixed martial arts career

Early career
Rua started his professional career at vale tudo events in Brazil, achieving three stoppages due to strikes, including a win over future Chute Boxe Academy teammate Evangelista Santos. In a fast-paced bout, Santos matched Rua on the feet until Rua took Santos to the ground and forced a stoppage due to strikes from mount. Shogun then entered the International Fighting Championships's (IFC) Global Domination Tournament. Rua won his first bout against Erik Wanderlei due to punches, and in the second bout got the first submission loss of his career against Renato Sobral with a guillotine in the third round.

PRIDE Fighting Championship

PRIDE Debut, Bushido and PRIDE 29
Following his victory in the IFC tournament, Shogun made his way to Japan to enter the PRIDE organization. He made his PRIDE debut at the inaugural PRIDE Bushido 1, a side promotion for lighter fighters. In his three Bushido appearances, Rua defeated Akira Shoji, Akihiro Gono, and Yasuhito Namekawa, all by strikes in the first round.

Rua graduated to his debut in a main PRIDE event at PRIDE 29, where he faced former professional wrestler Hiromitsu Kanehara, a Japanese fighter known for his toughness. Rua defeated Kanehara by stomps early in the first round.

PRIDE 2005 Middleweight Grand Prix
He entered the PRIDE 2005 Middleweight Grand Prix tournament as an underdog. For the first round of the tournament at PRIDE Total Elimination 2005, he faced Quinton Jackson, whom he had challenged after Jackson won a controversial split decision over Murilo Rua at PRIDE 29. Rua dominated the favored fighter from beginning to end, breaking Jackson's ribs with knee strikes and ending the fight in dramatic fashion with soccer kicks to the face in the first round. Jackson later said that Shogun was the best fighter he had ever fought. In the second round at PRIDE Critical Countdown 2005, Rua faced Antônio Rogério Nogueira, a member of Chute Boxe's rival academy Brazilian Top Team. Rua defeated Nogueira by unanimous decision. On 28 August 2005, Rua participated in PRIDE Final Conflict 2005, in which the last two bouts of the tournament were held on the same night. Rua defeated Alistair Overeem by TKO in the first round, while Ricardo Arona defeated Rua's teammate Wanderlei Silva by decision. Rua and Arona faced each other in the final bout of the tournament. At 2:54 in the first round, Rua knocked Arona out with punches to win the bout and become the 2005 Middleweight Grand Prix Champion. He received a black belt in Brazilian jiu-jitsu from Nino Schembri afterwards, a process that only took him four years from when he got his purple belt. This wrapped up a year in which he won Fighter of the Year honors from Sherdog.com.

Incident with Hammer House
In the next fight after his Grand Prix win, Shogun faced Heavyweight wrestling star and PRIDE Grand Prix 2000 Champion Mark Coleman at PRIDE 31. As Coleman executed a takedown, Rua landed awkwardly and dislocated his elbow, forcing a stoppage due to injury. Coleman was pulled off of Shogun by the referee, and was confronted immediately by members of Rua's corner. This led to an in-ring brawl between Hammer House and Chute Boxe.

End of PRIDE career

At PRIDE Final Conflict Absolute he defeated French kickboxer Cyrille Diabate by tapout due to stomps. At Pride 32 he submitted former UFC Heavyweight Champion Kevin Randleman with a kneebar at 2:35 of the first round, the only submission victory of his career. In his final PRIDE appearance at Pride 33, he fought a rematch with Alistair Overeem and knocked the Dutch fighter out at 3:37 of the first round.

By the end of his run at PRIDE, Rua was ranked as the top Light heavyweight in the world by Nokaut, Sherdog, and MMAWeekly.com.

Ultimate Fighting Championship
After the UFC bought out PRIDE, Shogun signed on with the UFC and made his debut in the organization at UFC 76. Facing The Ultimate Fighter 1 Winner Forrest Griffin, Rua was favoured to win. However, Rua had difficulty with Griffin and became exhausted early on and was dominated for the remainder of the fight. He succumbed to a rear-naked choke in the final seconds of the third round. He then had surgery for a pre-existing knee injury.

Rua left Chute Boxe in January 2008 and opened his own camp, Universidade da luta, with his brother Murilo in Curitiba.

In the months following his surgery Rua completely reruptured damaged ligaments during training and was forced to undergo a second knee surgery. This forced him to drop out of UFC 85. He was granted a rematch with Mark Coleman at UFC 93 in Dublin. Shogun defeated Coleman by TKO with 24 seconds left in the third round. The fight earned co-Fight of the Night honors and a $40,000 bonus. In spite of the award, Rua drew criticism from fans for his lackluster performance against Coleman, who was 44 years old at the time and had not competed in over two years.

Rua's next fight took place at UFC 97 in Montreal against former longtime UFC Light heavyweight Champion Chuck Liddell. Rua won by KO due to strikes. With this victory, Rua returned to the top-ten rankings for the Light heavyweight division, and the UFC decided to put him next in line for a title shot.

Title bouts with Machida
At UFC 104 Shogun lost by unanimous decision to UFC Light heavyweight Champion Lyoto Machida. All three judges scored the bout 48–47 in Machida's favor. Journalists and UFC President Dana White had scored the fight in Rua's favor.

Due to the controversy of the UFC 104 decision, a rematch was immediately announced and took place at UFC 113 on 8 May 2010 in Montreal. Rua won via knockout at 3:35 of round 1, after dropping Machida with a right and following up with punches on the ground. He was awarded the UFC Light heavyweight Championship, becoming just the second fighter to have won PRIDE and UFC titles. Following the victory, Rua underwent surgery in June to repair a knee injured during the bout against Machida.

UFC Light heavyweight Champion
Rua's first title defense was scheduled on 19 March 2011 against Rashad Evans, who had won by unanimous decision over Quinton Jackson at UFC 114 on 29 May 2010. However, following Jon Jones's victory over Ryan Bader at UFC 126, it was announced that Evans had blown his knee out in training and would not be able to face Rua. Jones was told during his post-fight interview that the UFC wanted him to replace Evans against Rua for the UFC Light Heavyweight Championship. Jones accepted and the fight was programmed for UFC 128. Quinton Jackson was also offered the title fight but declined,  as six weeks' notice did not provide enough time to make weight.

In the title fight, Jones began the fight with a flying knee to the head. Rua later said the blow greatly affected his performance for the rest of the bout. Jones kept the pressure on Rua throughout the rest of the fight, utilizing unorthodox striking and ground and pound.  Rua lost the fight via TKO in round three.

Post title fights
After the loss to Jones, Rua's rematch with Forrest Griffin took place on 27 August 2011 at UFC 134. In a match that looked like the complete opposite of their original bout, Shogun demonstrated good head movement and footwork, as well as good accuracy and striking power, to win the bout via KO early in the first round. Rua had now avenged three of his six losses.

Rua faced Dan Henderson on 19 November 2011 at UFC 139, losing via unanimous decision. Henderson was in control for most of the first three rounds, dropping Rua in the third. In the fourth round, the momentum started to shift towards Rua, who was able to mount Henderson. Despite the decision loss, Rua was awarded a Fight of the Night bonus award.  This fight is widely viewed as the "Fight of the Year" for 2011.

Rua was expected to face Thiago Silva on 21 July 2012, at UFC 149. However, Silva was forced out of the bout with an injury.

Rua faced Brandon Vera on 4 August 2012, at UFC on Fox: Shogun vs. Vera. In a back-and-forth affair, Shogun managed to drop Vera several times and won by TKO due to punches in the fourth round.

Rua faced Alexander Gustafsson on 8 December 2012, at UFC on Fox 5. He lost the fight by unanimous decision.

Rua was expected to face Antônio Rogério Nogueira in a rematch at UFC 161. However, Nogueira pulled out of the bout in the days leading up to the event citing a back injury. Perennial multi-divisional contender Chael Sonnen was briefly linked as a replacement for Nogueira but eventually Rua was pulled from the event altogether.

On 17 August 2013, at UFC Fight Night 26, Rua faced Chael Sonnen in the main event. He lost the fight via a guillotine choke submission in the first round.

Rua next faced James Te Huna on 7 December 2013, at UFC Fight Night 33. He won the fight via first round knockout.  The win also earned Rua his third Knockout of the Night bonus award.

A rematch with Dan Henderson took place on 23 March 2014 at UFC Fight Night 38. After winning the first two rounds and scoring a knockdown in each, he was defeated via strikes in the third round. Despite the TKO loss, Rua was given his third Fight of the Night bonus award, his second for a bout against Henderson.  Rua sustained a broken nose in his fight with Henderson that required surgery.

On 29 October 2014, it was announced that Rua would coach opposite Anderson Silva for The Ultimate Fighter: Brazil 4, which began filming in early 2015. Despite being coaches on the show, the two fighters will not face each other at the end of the season.

In September 2014, Rua revealed that he had signed a new, eight-fight contract with the UFC. Rua was expected to face Jimi Manuwa on 8 November 2014 at UFC Fight Night 56. However, on 29 October, it was revealed that Manuwa was injured and was replaced by Ovince St. Preux. Rua lost the fight via knockout at just 34 seconds into the first round, the fastest knockout loss of his career.

Ten years after their first bout, Rua had a rematch against former opponent Antônio Rogério Nogueira on 1 August 2015 at UFC 190.  He won the fight by unanimous decision and both participants were awarded Fight of the Night honors.

A long discussed bout against Rashad Evans was rescheduled and was expected to take place on 16 April 2016 at UFC on Fox 19. However, Rua was pulled from the fight on 9 March in favor of a matchup with Corey Anderson a couple of weeks later at UFC 198. Rua was awarded a split decision victory.

Rua next faced Gian Villante on 11 March 2017 at UFC Fight Night 106. He won the fight via technical knock-out in the third round.

A rematch with Ovince Saint Preux was expected to take place on 22 September 2017 at UFC Fight Night 117. However, Rua pulled out of the fight as the event was approaching on 16 September and was replaced by returning veteran Yushin Okami.

Rua was expected to face Volkan Oezdemir on 12 May 2018 at UFC Fight Night 129.  However it was reported on 13 April 2018 that Oezdemir was pulled from the event due to alleged visa issues restricting his travel to Chile. The pairing was left intact and rescheduled for 22 July 2018 at UFC Fight Night 134, However the bout was cancelled once again after promotion officials elected to pull Oezdemir from that fight in favor of a matchup against Alexander Gustafsson the following month at UFC 227. He was replaced by Anthony Smith. Rua lost the fight via knockout in the first round.

Rua faced Tyson Pedro on 2 December 2018 at UFC Fight Night 142. He won the fight via technical knockout in round three, finishing Pedro with a flurry of strikes after Pedro suffered a leg injury and was unable to defend himself.  This win earned him the Performance of the Night award.

Rua was expected to face Sam Alvey on 16 November 2019 at UFC on ESPN+ 22.  However, Alvey was removed from the fight on 25 October due to a broken hand and was replaced by Paul Craig. After three rounds, the back-and-forth fight was declared a split draw.

A third bout with Antônio Rogério Nogueira was scheduled to take place on 9 May 2020 at UFC 250. However, the bout was postponed due to the COVID-19 pandemic. The bout eventually took place on 26 July 2020 at UFC on ESPN 14. He won the fight via split decision.

A rematch with Paul Craig took place on 21 November 2020 at UFC 255. He lost the fight via technical knockout in round two when he submitted to punches.

Rua had a rematch against Ovince Saint Preux on 7 May 2022 at UFC 274. He lost the fight via split decision.

Rua faced Ihor Potieria on January 21, 2023, at UFC 283. He lost the fight via technical knockout in the first round and Rua announced his retirement during the post-fight interview.

Personal life
On 12 September 2007, Rua married physiotherapist Renata Ribeiro. Their first child, a daughter named Maria Eduarda, was born on 15 January 2010.

Before becoming a fighter, Rua worked as a model in Brazil, doing books, pictures, and even fashion shows for brands. Of this time, he once said "The first work is fight, and the second is model."

Championships and achievements
PRIDE Fighting Championships
2005 PRIDE Middleweight Grand Prix Champion
Ultimate Fighting Championship
 UFC Light Heavyweight Championship 
Knockout of the Night (Three times)  vs. Chuck Liddell, Lyoto Machida and James Te Huna
Fight of the Night (Four times) vs. Mark Coleman, Dan Henderson (x2), Antônio Rogério Nogueira
Performance of the Night (One time) vs. Tyson Pedro
Tied (with Jon Jones, Ovince Saint Preux and Glover Teixeira) for most fight-night bonuses in UFC Light Heavyweight division history (eight)
Fight of the Year (2011) vs. Dan Henderson
UFC Hall of Fame (Fight Wing, Class of 2018) vs. Dan Henderson at UFC 139
World MMA Awards
2010 Knockout of the Year vs. Lyoto Machida at UFC 113
Sherdog
2005 Fighter of the Year
2005 Fight of the Year versus Antônio Rogério Nogueira on 26 June
2009 Comeback Fighter of the Year
Mixed Martial Arts Hall of Fame
Wrestling Observer Newsletter awards
2011 Fight of the Year versus Dan Henderson on 19 November

Mixed martial arts record

|-
|Loss
|align=center|
|Ihor Potieria
|TKO (punches)
|UFC 283
|
|align=center|1
|align=center|4:05
|Rio de Janeiro, Brazil
|
|-
|Loss
|align=center|
|Ovince Saint Preux
|Decision (split)
|UFC 274
|
|align=center|3
|align=center|5:00
|Phoenix, Arizona, United States
|
|-
|Loss
|align=center|
|Paul Craig 
|TKO (submission to punches)
|UFC 255
|
|align=center|2
|align=center|3:36
|Las Vegas, Nevada, United States
|
|-
|Win
|align=center|
|Antônio Rogério Nogueira
|Decision (split)
|UFC on ESPN: Whittaker vs. Till 
|
|align=center|3
|align=center|5:00
|Abu Dhabi, United Arab Emirates
|
|-
|Draw 
|align=center|
|Paul Craig
|Draw (split)
|UFC Fight Night: Błachowicz vs. Jacaré 
|
|align=center|3
|align=center|5:00
|São Paulo, Brazil
|
|-
|Win
|align=center|26–11
|Tyson Pedro
|TKO (punches)
|UFC Fight Night: dos Santos vs. Tuivasa 
|
|align=center|3
|align=center|0:43
|Adelaide, Australia
| 
|-
|Loss
|align=center|25–11
|Anthony Smith
|KO (elbow)
|UFC Fight Night: Shogun vs. Smith 
|
|align=center|1
|align=center|1:29
|Hamburg, Germany
|
|-
|Win
|align=center|25–10
|Gian Villante
|TKO (punches)
|UFC Fight Night: Belfort vs. Gastelum
|
|align=center|3
|align=center|0:59
|Fortaleza, Brazil
|
|-
|Win
|align=center|24–10
|Corey Anderson
|Decision (split)
|UFC 198
|
|align=center|3
|align=center|5:00
|Curitiba, Brazil
|
|-
|Win
|align=center|23–10
|Antônio Rogério Nogueira
|Decision (unanimous)
|UFC 190
|
|align=center|3
|align=center|5:00
|Rio de Janeiro, Brazil
|
|-
|Loss
|align=center| 22–10
| Ovince Saint Preux
|KO (punches)
|UFC Fight Night: Shogun vs. Saint Preux
|
|align=center|1 
|align=center|0:34
| Uberlândia, Brazil
|
|-
|Loss
|align=center| 22–9
| Dan Henderson
|TKO (punches)
|UFC Fight Night: Shogun vs. Henderson 2
|
|align=center| 3 
|align=center| 1:31
| Natal, Brazil
|
|-
|Win
|align=center| 22–8
| James Te Huna
|KO (punch)
|UFC Fight Night: Hunt vs. Bigfoot
|
|align=center| 1
|align=center| 1:03
||Brisbane, Australia
|
|-
|Loss
|align=center| 21–8
| Chael Sonnen
|Submission (guillotine choke)
|UFC Fight Night: Shogun vs. Sonnen
|
|align=center| 1
|align=center| 4:47
|Boston, Massachusetts, United States
|
|-
|Loss 
|align=center| 21–7
| Alexander Gustafsson
|Decision (unanimous)
|UFC on Fox: Henderson vs. Diaz
|
|align=center| 3
|align=center| 5:00
|Seattle, Washington, United States
|
|-
|Win
|align=center| 21–6
| Brandon Vera
|TKO (punches) 
|UFC on Fox: Shogun vs. Vera
|
|align=center| 4
|align=center| 4:09
|Los Angeles, California, United States
|
|-
| Loss
|align=center| 20–6
| Dan Henderson
|Decision (unanimous)
|UFC 139
|
|align=center| 5
|align=center| 5:00
|San Jose, California, United States
|
|-
|Win
|align=center| 20–5
| Forrest Griffin
|KO (punches)
|UFC 134
|
|align=center| 1
|align=center| 1:53
|Rio de Janeiro, Brazil
|
|-
|Loss
|align=center| 19–5
| Jon Jones
| TKO (punches and knees)
|UFC 128
|
|align=center| 3
|align=center| 2:37
|Newark, New Jersey, United States
|
|-
|Win
|align=center| 19–4
|Lyoto Machida
|KO (punches)
|UFC 113
|
|align=center| 1
|align=center| 3:35
|Montreal, Quebec, Canada
|
|-
|Loss
|align=center| 18–4
|Lyoto Machida
|Decision (unanimous)
|UFC 104
|
|align=center| 5
|align=center| 5:00
|Los Angeles, California, United States
|
|-
|Win
|align=center| 18–3
| Chuck Liddell
|TKO (punches)
|UFC 97
|
|align=center| 1
|align=center| 4:28
|Montreal, Quebec, Canada
|
|-
|Win
|align=center| 17–3
| Mark Coleman
|TKO (punches)
|UFC 93
|
|align=center| 3
|align=center| 4:36
|Dublin, Ireland
|
|-
|Loss
|align=center| 16–3
| Forrest Griffin
|Submission (rear-naked choke)
|UFC 76
|
|align=center| 3
|align=center| 4:45
|Anaheim, California, United States
|
|-
|Win
|align=center| 16–2
| Alistair Overeem
|KO (punches)
|PRIDE 33
|
|align=center| 1
|align=center| 3:37
|Las Vegas, Nevada, United States
|
|-
|Win
|align=center| 15–2
| Kazuhiro Nakamura
|Decision (unanimous)
|PRIDE Shockwave 2006
|
|align=center| 3
|align=center| 5:00
|Saitama, Japan
|
|-
|Win
|align=center| 14–2
| Kevin Randleman
|Submission (kneebar)
|PRIDE 32
|
|align=center| 1
|align=center| 2:35
|Las Vegas, Nevada, United States
|
|-
| Win
|align=center| 13–2
| Cyrille Diabaté
|TKO (stomps)
|PRIDE Final Conflict Absolute
|
|align=center| 1
|align=center| 5:29
|Saitama, Japan
|
|-
|Loss
|align=center| 12–2
| Mark Coleman
|TKO (broken arm)
|PRIDE 31
|
|align=center| 1
|align=center| 0:49
|Saitama, Japan
|
|-
|Win
|align=center| 12–1
| Ricardo Arona
|KO (punches)
| rowspan=2|PRIDE Final Conflict 2005
| rowspan=2|
|align=center| 1
|align=center| 2:54
| rowspan=2|Saitama, Japan
|
|-
|Win
|align=center| 11–1
| Alistair Overeem
|TKO (punches)
|align=center| 1
|align=center| 6:42
|
|-
|Win
|align=center| 10–1
| Antônio Rogério Nogueira
|Decision (unanimous)
|PRIDE Critical Countdown 2005
|
|align=center| 3
|align=center| 5:00
|Saitama, Japan
|
|-
|Win
|align=center| 9–1
| Quinton Jackson
|TKO (soccer kicks)
|PRIDE Total Elimination 2005
|
|align=center| 1
|align=center| 4:47
|Osaka, Japan
|
|-
|Win
|align=center| 8–1
| Hiromitsu Kanehara
|TKO (stomp)
|PRIDE 29
|
|align=center| 1
|align=center| 1:40
|Saitama, Japan
|
|-
|Win
|align=center| 7–1
| Yasuhito Namekawa
|TKO (punches)
|PRIDE Bushido 5
|
|align=center| 1
|align=center| 6:02
|Osaka, Japan
|
|-
|Win
|align=center| 6–1
| Akihiro Gono
|TKO (soccer kicks)
|PRIDE Bushido 2
|
|align=center| 1
|align=center| 9:04
|Kanagawa, Japan
|
|-
|Win
|align=center| 5–1
| Akira Shoji
|KO (punches)
|PRIDE Bushido 1
|
|align=center| 1
|align=center| 3:47
|Saitama, Japan
| 
|-
|Loss
|align=center| 4–1
| Renato Sobral
|Submission (guillotine choke)
| rowspan=2|IFC: Global Domination
| rowspan=2|
|align=center| 3
|align=center| 3:07
| rowspan=2|Denver, Colorado, United States
|
|-
|Win
|align=center| 4–0
| Erik Wanderley
|TKO (punches)
|align=center| 2
|align=center| 2:54
|
|-
|Win
|align=center| 3–0
| Evangelista Santos
|TKO (punches)
|Meca World Vale Tudo 9
|
|align=center| 1
|align=center| 9:22
|Rio de Janeiro, Brazil
|
|-
|Win
|align=center| 2–0
| Angelo de Oliveira
|TKO (soccer kicks)
|Meca World Vale Tudo 8
|
|align=center| 1
|align=center| 0:55
|Curitiba, Brazil
|
|-
|Win
|align=center| 1–0
| Rafael Freitas
|KO (kick)
|Meca World Vale Tudo 7
|
|align=center| 1
|align=center| 4:00
|Curitiba, Brazil
|
|-

See also
 List of male mixed martial artists
 List of PRIDE champions
 List of UFC champions

References

External links

1981 births
Living people
Brazilian male mixed martial artists
Light heavyweight mixed martial artists
Heavyweight mixed martial artists
Mixed martial artists utilizing Muay Thai
Mixed martial artists utilizing Brazilian jiu-jitsu
Brazilian practitioners of Brazilian jiu-jitsu
People awarded a black belt in Brazilian jiu-jitsu
Brazilian Muay Thai practitioners
Sportspeople from Curitiba
Ultimate Fighting Championship champions
Brazilian people of Italian descent
Brazilian people of Portuguese descent
Ultimate Fighting Championship male fighters